Files Crossroad is an unincorporated community in Berkeley County, West Virginia, United States. The community is located east of Martinsburg on West Virginia Route 45 at its crossroads with County Route 45/4. The community was originally known as Smoketown, hence the name of its historic Smoketown Cemetery.

The Rush-Miller House, located near Files Crossroad, was listed on the National Register of Historic Places in 1985.

References

Unincorporated communities in Berkeley County, West Virginia
Unincorporated communities in West Virginia